Emek HaYarden Regional Council (Mo'atza Azorit 'Emeq HaYarden, lit. Jordan Valley Regional Council) is a regional council comprising much of the western shore of the Sea of Galilee, the southern parts of its eastern shore, and the northern part of the Jordan Valley all the way to Beit She'an in the south.

History
Emek HaYarden Regional Council was the first regional council in Israel, established in 1949.

In Israel, the northern part of the Jordan Valley is called Emeq HaYarden and was part of Israel before the 1967 Six-Day War; the southern part is called Bik'at HaYarden, which gives the name to a separate regional council and was captured by Israel in 1967. The two Hebrew words emek and bik'a are practically synonymous, both "Emeq HaYarden" and "Bik'at HaYarden" meaning "Jordan Valley"; the distinction is only administrative and political.

Most of the settlements are of the kibbutz type and are located on Highway 90, a north–south road which traverses the council's territory parallel to the Jordan River and along the western shore of the Sea of Galilee. The offices of the council are located between Degania Alef and the Tzemah Industrial Zone.

List of villages
This regional council provides various municipal services for the villages within its territory:

Kibbutz-type settlements
Afikim
Alumot
Ashdot Ya'akov Meuhad
Ashdot Ya'akov Ihud
Beit Zera
Degania Alef
Degania Bet
Ein Gev
Gesher
Ginosar
Hokuk
Kvutzat Kinneret
Masada
Ma'agan
Ravid
Sha'ar HaGolan
Tel Katzir

Community settlements
HaOn, a former kibbutz
Poria Illit
Poria – Kfar Avoda
Poria – Neve Oved

Moshava-type settlement
Moshavat Kinneret

Moshav-type settlement
Almagor

External links
Official website 

 
Regional councils in Northern District (Israel)